Estadio António Coimbra da Mota is a multi-use stadium in Estoril, Portugal.  It is currently used mostly for football matches and is the home stadium of Primeira Liga side G.D. Estoril Praia.  The stadium has a capacity to hold 8,000 spectators. The stadium also plays host to Estoril's reserve team home games.

Usage

Football
The Swedish national football team used the stadium as a training ground in preparation for UEFA Euro 2004.

The stadium has also played host to matches of Portuguese youth team games most notably the Portuguese national under-21 football team, the most recent match being on 9 September 2011 in a Friendly match against the Slovakian national under-21 football team in a 1–1 draw.

On 31 March 2015, the senior Portugal team played at the ground, in a 0–2 friendly defeat against Cape Verde.

On 15 January 2018 a crack appeared in the away stand during a match versus Porto, forcing its evacuation and abandonment of the game at half time.

On November 8, 2018, the stadium hosted an international friendly between the US and Portuguese Women's national teams.

Rugby
The stadium has also played host to games involving the Portuguese national rugby union team, most recently being against Ukraine in a 2006 European Nations Cup First Division match and against Uruguay in a 2007 Rugby World Cup repechage qualification match.

References

External links
 Estoril Praia Stadium view
 ZeroZero Stadium profile
 ForaDeJogo.net Stadium profile
 StadiumDB profile

G.D. Estoril Praia
Football venues in Portugal
Sports venues in Lisbon District
Sports venues completed in 1939
Rugby union stadiums in Portugal